Sutton station may refer to:

Stations in the UK 
 Kings Sutton railway station, Northamptonshire
 Little Sutton railway station, Cheshire
 Long Sutton railway station, Lincolnshire
 Long Sutton and Pitney railway station, Somerset
 Sutton Bridge railway station, Lincolnshire
 Sutton railway station (Cambridgeshire)
 Sutton Coldfield railway station, West Midlands
 Sutton Common railway station, London
 Sutton-on-Hull railway station, East Riding of Yorkshire
 Sutton-on-Sea railway station, Lincolnshire
 Sutton Park railway station, Birmingham
 Sutton Parkway railway station, Nottinghamshire
 Sutton Staithe Halt railway station, North Norfolk
 Sutton railway station (London), sometimes known as Sutton (Surrey)
 Sutton Town railway station, Birmingham
 West Sutton railway station, London

Stations elsewhere 
 Sutton railway station (Ireland), in Sutton, Dublin, Ireland
 Sutton railway station, Jamaica, a place on the List of National Heritage Sites in Jamaica

Other 
 Sutton Bridge Power Station
 Sutton Coldfield transmitting station